Aigars Apinis (born 9 June 1973, in Aizkraukle) is a Latvian athlete. He participates in F52 class which means he has limited finger movement and no trunk or leg function. 

He started to practice in 1998, but already at the 2000 Summer Paralympics he won two bronze medals – in discus throw and shot put. At the 2004 Summer Paralympics he became the Olympic champion in discus throw and was 4th in shot put. Apinis won the gold medal in discus throw at the 2016 Summer Paralympics. At the 2020 Summer Paralympics, he won a bronze medal in Men's discus throw F52.

Career
In the fall of 2010 Apinis created resonance in the society, by stating that he is ready to sell his 2000 Sydney Paralympics bronze medal (first paralympic medal in the history of Latvia) in an auction, in order to provide Latvian Paralympic Committee with funds, which would allow Latvian delegation to participate in the 2011 IPC Athletics World Championships.

At the 2011 IPC (International Paralympic Committee) World Championships in New Zealand, Apinis won the gold medal in the shot put F52/53 category, also setting a new world record for his category.

References

External links

 
 

1973 births
Living people
People from Aizkraukle
Latvian male discus throwers
Latvian male shot putters
World record holders in Paralympic athletics
Paralympic athletes of Latvia
Paralympic gold medalists for Latvia
Paralympic silver medalists for Latvia
Paralympic bronze medalists for Latvia
Paralympic medalists in athletics (track and field)
Athletes (track and field) at the 2000 Summer Paralympics
Athletes (track and field) at the 2004 Summer Paralympics
Athletes (track and field) at the 2008 Summer Paralympics
Athletes (track and field) at the 2012 Summer Paralympics
Athletes (track and field) at the 2016 Summer Paralympics
Athletes (track and field) at the 2020 Summer Paralympics
Medalists at the 2000 Summer Paralympics
Medalists at the 2004 Summer Paralympics
Medalists at the 2008 Summer Paralympics
Medalists at the 2012 Summer Paralympics
Medalists at the 2016 Summer Paralympics
Medalists at the 2020 Summer Paralympics
Wheelchair discus throwers
Wheelchair shot putters
Paralympic discus throwers
Paralympic shot putters